Leon Qafzezi (born 23 February 1953 in Tirana, Albania) is an Albanian writer and cineaste.

Life
Leon Qafzezi was born 23 February 1953 in Albania, the son of Niko Qafzezi and Amalia Qafzezi (Zheji). He studied at the Academy of Arts of Albania (1974-1976). Qafzezi lives and works in Tirana.

Career
Since 1986 he has worked as producer, director, inspector of film, for the "New Albania" Film Studio and "Alb-Film-Distribution"(1986-1992). During 1993-1998, he worked for the Albanian National Television (RTVSH) in the Department of Film, Department of Programming, and as director, as well as a freelance journalist in Bashkimi (The union), Skena dhe Ekrani (The scene and the screen), and Ylli (The star) magazine as a film critic.

In 1992. he co-founded FILM magazine together with Piro Milkani and Vasil Tabaku, and is chief editor of the magazine. He also directs the "Eagle Film Albania", a private held cinematographic society.

Qafzezi is a member of the Albanian League of Writers and Artists since 1997, and of the "Union of Albanian Cineasts", and since 2000 of the "Albanian Journalists League”.

Published works

Novels
 Passport to Hell, 1997
 The sky down, 1998
 The market of dreams, Toena, 1998. 
 The black hole, Toena, 1998. 
 The prostitute of Abuokir, 2008
 Selected novels, Morava, 2011.

Poetry
 No love for credit, 1992
 Eda, 1996
 Funeral of Lives, Morava, 2012.

Monographs
 Author, Toena, 1999. 
 Godard, Toena, 2002
 Kubrick, 2002

Studies and critics for films
 Great Directors, 1993
 Directors Portrait, 1996
 Albanian Film and Time, 2002
 Interview for Film, 2002
 With keep movies, 2003
 The History of World Cinematography, INFBOTUES, 2008.

Documentary-Filmography

Collaborations with magazines
 FILM, 1992-2002
 Film Image, 1997 (Album photography)

References

 -"Portret Artisti" from Flori Slatina(1998) "55 Newspaper"1998
 -"Enciklopedi e Kinematografise Shqiptare" from Abaz Hoxha 1999"Akademia Shqiptaro-Amerikane e Shkencave dhe Arteve"(Seksioni per Evropen)
 -"Enciklopedi e Kinematografise Shqiptare"from Abaz Hoxha (2002)"TOENA""Enciklopedi e Teatrit dhe Kinematografise Shqiptare"from Josif Papajorgji(2009)TOENA
 -"Filmi dhe Letersia hobi im"interview with L.Qafzezi from Sh.Bozha (2005)Newspaper "Drita"
 -"Filmi dhe Letersia hobi im"interview with L.Qafzezi from Sh.Bozha(2005)Newspaper"55"
 -"Shtegtimi i Moisiut pertej detit"interwieu with L.Qafzezi from Petrika Grosi(2004)Newspaper"Gazeta Shqiptare"
 -"Aleksander Moisiu ne film"Koresp.(2003)Newspaper"Drita"
 -"Sipa Press"Premiere filmi dokumentar Televiziv ne Paris"Koresp.(2001)Newspaper "Drita"
 -"Historiku i KInematografise Boterore"ne nje liber te Leon Qafzezit"from R.Polisi(2008)Newspaper"RD"
 -"Per mbrojtjen e Jetes"premiere nga Leon Qafzezi"from Kristofor Bulo,Ilirian Skenderi(2002)Newspaper"Republika"
 -"Ne mbrojtje te Jetes"premiere filmi dokumentar televiziv nga Leon Qafzezi"from Koresp.(2002)Newspaper"Tirana"
 -"Krijime te reja ne fushen e librit dhe te filmit"from Koresp(2008)Newspaper"Gazeta Ndryshe"
 -"Ringjallja"film artistik televiziv nga Leon Qafzezi"from Oriana Bega(2005)Newspaper"Drita"
 -"Sue Ryder Care"ne sherbim te njerezve"from Grigor Gjermeni(2004)Newspaper"Republika"
 -"Qafzezi nje dokumentar per bamiresit"Ryder" from coresp(2004)Newspaper"Gazeta Shqiptare"
 -"Sue Ryder Care"ne sherbim te njerezve"from B.Goce(2004)Newspaper"Dita"
 -"Sue Ryder Care"ne sherbim te njerezve"Nje film dokumentar nga Leon Qafzezi"from Grigor Gjermeni(2004)Newspaper"Drita"
 -"Dashuria e Hemingway dhefinesa e Millerit"-veshtrim mbi librin"Autore"te Leon Qafzezit"from Esmeralda Bardhyli(2000)Newspaper"55"
 -"Godard"nje liber i ri nga Leon Qafzezi"from coresp.(2002)Newspaper"Drita"
 -"Godard"vitrina Drites"from coresp.(2002)Newspaper"Drita"
 -"Stanley Kubrick,versioni shqip"-Sillet nga Leon Qafzezi monografia e regjisorit qe beri emer dhe epoke"from coresp.(2002)Newspaper"Republika"
 -"Ernest Hemingway dhe Parisi"-dokumentar nga Leon Qafzezi"from coresp.(2002)Newspaper"Drita"
 -"Mesazh Humanizmi"-premiere filmi dokumentar tv"from Gezim Tota&Martin Londo(2000)Magazine"FILM"
 -"Luigji Monti,Mesash dashurie"shenime rreth filmit televiziv te Leon Qafzezit"from R.Polisi(2000)Newspaper"55"
 -"Pashaporte per ferr"nga Leon Qafzezi"from coresp.(1998)Newspaper"Republika"
 -"Nje deshmi morale per kohen tone"from Lluka Qafoku(1998)Newspaper"Republika"
 -"Doli ne qarkullim"Pashaporte per Ferr"from coresp.(1998)Newspaper"Bulevard"
 -"Tregu i Enderrave"te Qafzezit"-Nje individualiteti spikatur ne fushen e noveles"from Flori Slatina(1999)Newspaper"55"
 -"Hapesire e re Ekzistencialiste e mendimit poetik"from Perikli Jorgoni&Albana Skenderi(1997)Newspaper"Albania"
 -"Ekzistencializmi i pershkon te gjitha poezite"-shenime per vellimin poetik"Eda "te Leon Qafzezit"from Brikena Cuadari(1996)

Newspaper"Drita"

 -"Kaos Shqipetar ne fantazine e nje shkrimtari"-"Qielli poshte"novela e re e Leon Qafzezit"from Flori Slatina(1998)Newspaper"55"
 -"Ne konkursin e madh te fotografise boterore"from coresp.(1996)Newspaper"RD"
 -"Qafzezi analizon autoret bashkekohore"from coresp(2000)Newspaper"Republika"
 -"Mozaik Portretesh"-Libri i Leon Qafzezit"Autore"from Blerina Lleshi(1999)Newspaper"RD"
 -"Vrimat e zeza"-novele nga Leon Qafzezi"from coresp.(1999)Newspaper"Drita"
 -"Vrimat e zeza"te Qafzezi"from A.B.(1999)Newspaper "Republika"
 -"Vrimat e zeza"nje liber i ri Leon Qafzezit"from coresp.(1999)Newspaper"55"
 -"Portrete Kineastesh"nga Leon Qafzezi"from Muharrem Fejzo(1996_Newspaper"RD"
 -"Nje vizion mbi magjine e artiti te shtate"from Vasil Tabaku(1993)Newspaper"RD"
 -"Thjeshtesi shprehese dhe force vargu"-Dashuri pa kredi"nga Leon Qafzezi"from Vasil Tabaku(1996)Newspaper"RD

1953 births
Magazine editors
Albanian film directors
Albanian male poets
Albanian novelists
Living people
People from Tirana
20th-century novelists
Male novelists
21st-century novelists
20th-century Albanian poets
21st-century Albanian poets
University of Arts (Albania) alumni
Albanian journalists
Albanian publishers (people)
Albanian film critics
Albanian non-fiction writers
20th-century male writers
21st-century male writers
Male non-fiction writers